The Newport 30 is an American sailboat, that was designed by Gary Mull and first built in 1968. The design is out of production.

The Newport 30 design was developed into the Newport 31 in 1987.

Production
The boat was built by Lindsay Plastics under their Capital Yachts Inc. brand in the United States, starting in 1968.

Design
The Newport 30 is a small recreational and racing keelboat, built predominantly of fiberglass. It has a masthead sloop rig, an internally-mounted spade-type rudder and a fixed fin keel.

Variants
Newport 30-1
This model is also called the "Mark I" and was built from 1968-1973. The PHRF racing average handicap is 195 with a high of 211 and low of 189.
Newport 30-2
This model is also called the "Mark II" or "Phase II" and was modified to compete in the International Offshore Rule 3/4-ton race class, with a taller mast and shorter main sail boom. It was built starting in 1974. The PHRF racing average handicap is 183 with a high of 183 and low of 183.
Newport 30-2 SD
It was built starting in 1974. It displaces , carries  of lead ballast. The PHRF racing average handicap is 186 with a high of 205 and low of 174.
Newport 30-3
This model is also called the "Mark III" and was modified for cruising with its mast moved further aft, wheel steering replacing the earlier tiller, longer waterline length and a diesel engine. It was built starting in 1984.
Newport 30-3 SD
It was built starting in 1984. It displaces . The PHRF racing average handicap is 183 with a high of 180 and low of 186.
Newport 30-3 TM
This model has a taller mast. It was built starting in 1984. The PHRF racing average handicap is 180 with a high of 198 and low of 174.

See also
List of sailing boat types

References

Keelboats
1960s sailboat type designs
Sailing yachts
Sailboat type designs by Gary Mull
Sailboat types built by Capital Yachts